H2O: Just Add Water, also known as H2O, is an Australian fantasy teen drama created by Jonathan M. Shiff. It first screened on Australia's Network Ten and runs in syndication on channels in over 120 countries and has a worldwide audience of more than 250 million. It was filmed on location at Sea World and other locations on the Gold Coast. The show revolves around three teenage girls facing everyday teen problems with an added twist: they are mermaids with powers over water.

Only two series with a total of 52 episodes were originally planned, but due to popular demand, a third series was filmed. Series one premiered in July 2006, followed by series two in September 2007. Series three first aired in the United Kingdom in October 2009, with the Australian premiere occurring in May 2010.

Plot
Rikki Chadwick, Emma Gilbert, and Cleo Sertori are three teenage Australian girls who find themselves stranded on the mysterious Mako Island, where they end up in a pool under a dormant volcano just as a full moon passes above them, bathing the pool in light. The girls are rescued and brought back to shore, only to discover something strange. Ten seconds after coming into contact with water, the girls transform into mermaids. After further experimentation, the girls also discover they have supernatural powers over water. The trio enlist the help of Cleo's friend Lewis McCartney to help them keep their secret and find out more about it.

Everyday situations, such as bathing and dealing with rainy weather, become tricky as the girls struggle with their newfound abilities, which come with many advantages and disadvantages, while also trying to keep them a secret from everyone else, including their families. They soon adapt to their new abilities and lifestyles.

Series two introduces Charlotte Watsford, a rival to Cleo, for dating Lewis shortly after Cleo had broken up with him. She gains mermaid powers and becomes the main antagonist of series two. She has all three of the mermaids' powers. In the end, Charlotte loses both her powers and Lewis.

Series three sees the departure of Emma, who has left to travel the world with her parents.  A new character, Bella Hartley, is introduced and it is discovered that she has been a mermaid since the age of nine. Rikki and Cleo become friends with Bella, but are soon beset by a mysterious tentacle of water with a connection to Mako Island. A new boy, Will Benjamin, also arrives and becomes friends with the trio when he discovers that they are mermaids. The girls learn that Earth is in the path of a comet that could destroy the planet. They try to think of a plan to stop the catastrophe.

Cast

Main
Cariba Heine as Rikki, the new girl in town at the start of the show, who tends to be aloof and rebellious. Her power is the ability to control heat in water, ranging from warming to boiling, which eventually grows to allow her to control fire and lightning. Heine appears in all series of the show, and makes a special guest appearance in the spinoff series Mako: Island of Secrets.
Claire Holt as Emma (series 1–2), who has a confident and responsible, if somewhat controlling, personality. She has the ability to freeze water, and later develops the ability to control clouds, ice and snow. Holt appears in series one and two, but left the show at the end of series two to film Messengers 2: The Scarecrow, with the character's departure explained as travelling the world with her family.
Phoebe Tonkin as Cleo, who at first is shy and a little awkward and does not like water, but eventually becomes outgoing and personable. She is able to control and mould the form of water, as well as increase or decrease the amount of water present. She is later able to control the wind. Tonkin appears in all series of the show.
Angus McLaren as Lewis, Cleo's childhood friend and later boyfriend who is academically gifted and thinks of himself as a scientist. He helps the girls keep their secret and works to understand how and why the girls transformed into mermaids. After appearing in both series one and two, McLaren left the show during the third series to begin filming Packed to the Rafters, but guest starred in the final episode of the show.
Indiana Evans as Bella (series 3), the new girl in series three. She is a singer and performs at Rikki's cafe. Bella became a mermaid in the sea caves of Ireland when she was nine, and has the power to change water into gelatine and a crystalline substance. During the series, she and Will develop feelings for each other, and eventually become a couple.
Luke Mitchell as Will (series 3), a skilled swimmer and free-diver who is introduced in series three. While exploring Mako Island, he finds the moon pool and is attacked by the water, causing him to search for the cause of the strange event. He is Bella's love interest and becomes closer to the girls once he discovers they are mermaids.

Supporting
Burgess Abernethy as Zane, who is the arrogant local rich boy. In series one, he becomes obsessed with discovering the identity of the mermaids after catching a glimpse of one. He later develops an on-again, off-again relationship with Rikki. At the end of series one, when he finds out she, Emma and Cleo are mermaids, he stops his obsessive behaviour to protect Rikki. In series three, he transforms the Juice Net cafe and goes into a business partnership with Rikki, naming the cafe after her. 
Cleo Massey as Kim, Cleo's younger sister.
Alan David Lee as Don Sertori, Cleo and Kim's father.
Deborah Coulls as Bev (series 1), Cleo and Kim's mother and Don's wife and then later ex-wife. They divorced prior to the events of series 2.
Trent Sullivan as Elliot (series 1–2), Emma's younger brother.
Jamie Timony as Nate, one of Zane's friends.
Brittany Byrnes as Charlotte (series 2), the new girl who becomes the main antagonist of series two. She enjoys the arts and sciences, but can be controlling and manipulative. She comes into conflict with the girls, especially Cleo, when she begins to date Lewis subsequent to his break-up with Cleo. Upon transforming into a mermaid, she obtains all of the girls' collective powers - clarified as being due to the fact that she was exposed to the transformation conditions on her own rather than the original three being present at the same time.  She permanently loses her abilities after a confrontation with the trio. She does not return in series three.
Craig Horner as Ash (series 2), a keen equestrian and riding coach who appears during series two. He forms a relationship with Emma, but does not learn of her being a mermaid until the season finale, when Emma reveals her identity. Horner does not appear in series three due to filming Legend of the Seeker.
Penni Gray as Sam Sertori (née Roberts) (series 3), Don's second wife and Cleo and Kim's stepmother who works for the National Park association. In "Valentine's Day", she inspects one of Don's boats, but is drawn into an argument between Kim and Cleo when she is knocked overboard of that boat. Eventually, she and Don start getting romantically closer, which Cleo approves but Kim does not. They get married in "To Have & To Hold Back".
Taryn Marler as Sophie (series 3), an ambitious and driven character who becomes the main antagonist of series three. She is Will's older sister and takes an immediate dislike to Bella because Sophie sees her as a threat to Will's success as a free diver. She becomes a manager in Rikki's cafe and does as much as possible to cause grief for the mermaids, including destroying Zane and Rikki's relationship. She also tries to get her brother Will to go against Bella by saying she is a distraction.

Episodes

Development and production
There are three different types of mermaid tails used on the show: custom-fitted tails that the girls swim in, a "floppy tail" used for stationary shots, and a "hard tail" for stunts. The custom costumes took six months to build, with the tails and tops made from body casts and comprising individually hand-crafted scales. Inside the tail are leg straps where the girls are strapped up and then zipped up. Once in costume, the girls have to be lifted into the water. Attempts were made to minimise the on-screen visibility of the zips on the tails, such as adding extra scales and crafting a ridge of material around the length of the zip. The tail fin itself was designed with a foot pedal to assist the actresses with swimming.

Multimedia

Home media

All series have been released on DVD in Region 4 PAL format. Series one comprises six individual DVD sets released between September 2007 and November 2008, and a complete series set released in June 2009. Series two comprises three individual sets released between February and September 2009, and a complete series set released in November 2009. Series three comprises two individual sets released in July and September 2012, with a complete series released in December 2012.

A three-disc set, H2O: Season 1, Volume 1, containing the first 13 episodes of series 1 for Region 1 NTSC format was released on 16 June 2009 by Nickelodeon as a manufacture-on-demand (MOD) DVD-R release via Amazon.com through their CreateSpace service. No follow-up DVD volume releases were made from this initial set, which was later discontinued. A complete series DVD boxed set was released in Region 1 NTSC format on 6 November 2012 from New Video, and all three series were made available for purchase individually beginning on 5 March 2013.

Soundtracks
An official soundtrack for series two of the show, titled H2O: Just Add Water and recorded by singer Kate Alexa, was first released on 10 September 2007 in Australia on Liberation Records. It has since been made available worldwide. Its lead track, "No Ordinary Girl", is the theme song for the show.  "No Ordinary Girl" is performed by Ellie Henderson in series one, by Kate Alexa in series two and by Indiana Evans in series three.

A second soundtrack, featuring music from series three, was first released on iTunes on 17 February 2011, and later worldwide in March 2011. It is also titled H2O: Just Add Water, and most tracks on the album were recorded by actress Indiana Evans.

Books
Several children's books have been released by Nickelodeon UK:

 No Ordinary Girl – 2 February 2009
 Living with Secrets – 2 February 2009
 Fishy Business – 5 May 2009
 A Sleepover Tail – 6 July 2009
 Sequins for Sea Queens – 7 January 2010
 First Crush – 29 April 2010
 Moonspell – 5 August 2010
 Testing Times – 6 January 2011
 Hot Stuff – 9 June 2011
 In Too Deep – 4 August 2011
 Mermaid Emotions – 27 October 2011
 Siren Status – 2 February 2012

Awards and nominations

Spinoffs
In July 2011, the production of a 26-episode spinoff was announced. The new series, Mako: Island of Secrets, follows the adventures of 15-year-old Zac and mermaids Sirena, Nixie, and Lyla. In the final series of the show, Cariba Heine makes a guest appearance as Rikki.

In May 2015, an animated spinoff targeted to children premiered on Netflix, titled H2O: Mermaid Adventures.

See also

 Mermaids in popular culture

References

External links

 H2O: Just Add Water – ZDF Enterprises promotional website
 H2O: Just Add Water at the Australian Television Information Archive
 
 

H2O: Just Add Water
2006 Australian television series debuts
2010 Australian television series endings
Australian children's television series
Australian children's fantasy television series
Australian high school television series
English-language television shows
Television series about shapeshifting
Mermaids in popular culture
Mermaids in television
Network 10 original programming
Teen drama television series